The Golden Republic was an American rock band, originally formed in Kansas City, Missouri in 1999 under the name People by founding members Ben Grimes and Ryan Shank.

In 2003, The Golden Republic signed with Astralwerks Records, releasing one album and one EP through the label.

The band split up in December 2006 and Kenn Jankowski went on to form The Republic Tigers.

Line-up
Harry Anderson (bass)
Ben Grimes (guitar, lead vocals)
Kenn Jankowski (guitar, keyboards)
Ryan Shank (drums)

Discography

EPs
People, released September 21, 2004

Albums
The Golden Republic, released February 8, 2005

Compilations
 Their final single "Hemel Dalingen" was included on the compilation First Blood on OxBlood Records in 2008.

External links

Rock music groups from Missouri
Astralwerks artists
Musical groups from Kansas City, Missouri
Family musical groups